Everard (or Everard of Calne; died probably 1146)  was a medieval Bishop of Norwich.

Life

Everard was from Calne in Wiltshire. He was a royal chaplain and held prebends in the diocese of London as well as an archdeacon in the diocese of Salisbury.

Everard was consecrated on 12 June 1121. He resigned the see in 1145 to be a monk at the Cistercian monastery of Fontenay in the Côte-d'Or in France.

Everard died on 12 October probably in 1146. He was buried at Fontenay before 21 September 1147.

Citations

References
 British History Online Bishops of Norwich accessed on 29 October 2007
 

Bishops of Norwich
1140s deaths
12th-century English Roman Catholic bishops
Year of birth unknown